Tonka Tomicic Petric (born 31 May 1976) is a Chilean model and television presenter of Croatian origin.

Best known for televisions shows  on TVN and Canal 13 as Buenos Dias A Todos, Viña's International Festival and  Bienvenidos. She's considered one of the most important females TV personalities of Chile.  After being a former fashion model in Chile, Tomicic become the face, and spoken celebrity  of "Almacenes Paris" a department store's since 2005 and Garnier's Chilean ambassador  since 2007,  her parents are Croatian immigrants to Chile.

Early life
She was born on May 31, 1976, in Antofagasta, Chile. her parents are Antonio Tomičić, and Marija Petrić, both Croatians immigrants to Chile. Tomicic grew up in the commune of La Florida, Santiago, she completed her primary and secondary education at the Colegio Argentino del Sagrado Corazón de Jesús, in  Providencia,  In 1994 she entered the Universidad Tecnológica Metropolitana to study design in visual communication, a career that she finally did not pursue.

Career

She was discovered as a model  by  New Models Agency, in Chile as 14 yrs old, After the first contact, Tomičić filmed her first television commercial for the Tigre shoe company. She was crowned queen of the XXIV version of the Miss World 1995  Chilean Version pagated, and  representing her country in the Miss World 1995 pageant held in South Africa. Her career as a beauty queen continued when she was crowned Virreina Sudamericana 1996 in Bolivia and Miss Atlántico Internacional 1999 in Uruguay.

In 2002 she was invited to the program Pase lo que Pase of TVN as a fashion commentator. She received her big break when she became one of the principal co-presenters of this program and went on to assume the co-presenter role of Buenos dias a todos, a popular morning television show. In February 2006, Tomicic was presenter of the Viña del Mar International Music Festival,  in 2007 and 2008  with Sergio Lagos. In 2009 Tomic leaves "Buenos Dias a Todos" and TVN thanks to an offer from "Canal 13" to become the presenter of the morning program "Bienvenidos" and the prime shows: "El Hormiguero" , Tonka Tanka and as host of the reality show Mundos Opuestos.

Tomicic is currently face  and spoken celebrity  of Almacenes Paris department store chain since 2005, as well as the Claro telecommunications company and has beene the Garnier's Chilean  brand ambassador since 2007, where there is a dye called "Chocolate Tonka".

Personal life

Since 2004 she has been in a romantic relationship with Marco Antonio López Spagui, better known as Parived. The couple were married according to the Jewish rite on April 16, 2014, in the city of Jerusalem, Israel, after Tomičić renounced Catholicism, thus embracing her partner's Judaism.

Television
 La mañana del 13 (2001 Canal 13)
 Pase lo que pase (2002 TVN)
 Buenos días a todos (2005–2009)
 Teletón Chile (2006)
 Teletón Chile (2007)
 Hijos del Monte (2008)
 Teletón Chile (2008)
 El hormiguero (2010)
 Viva la mañana (2010) - Guest Star
 La movida del festival (2010) - TV Hostess
 Chile ayuda a Chile (2010)
 Tonka Tanka (2010) - TV Hostess
 Primera dama (2010)
 Fear Factor Chile (2010)
 Alfombra roja (2010)
 Teletón Chile (2010)
 Bienvenidos (2011–) - TV Hostess
 Teletón Chile (2011)
 Mundos Opuestos (2012)
 No basta con ser bella: Miss Chile 2012 (2012) - Jury
 Teletón Chile (2012)
 Proyecto Miss Chile (2013) - TV Hostess

References

External links
  Terra.cl Erika Cabrera: Los secretos de belleza de Tonka Tomicic, July 30, 2008, accessed July 30, 2008
 
 Blog de Tonka Tomicic en Caras.
  Biografias.es Tonka Tomicic

1976 births
Chilean female models
Chilean people of Croatian descent
Chilean television presenters
Living people
Miss World Chile winners
Miss World 1995 delegates
People from Antofagasta
Chilean women television presenters
Chilean television personalities